Anne Thompson may refer to:

 Anne Elise Thompson (born 1934), United States federal judge
 Anne Thompson (artist), American artist
 Anne Thompson (film journalist), American journalist writing on film
 Anne Thompson (TV journalist), American journalist working for NBC News
 Anne M. Thompson, American scientist

See also
Annie Thompson (1845–1913), spouse of Sir John Thompson, the fourth Prime Minister of Canada
Anne Thomson, British nurse
Ann Thompson Gerry (1763–1849), wife of Vice-President Elbridge Gerry
Georgia Ann Thompson (1893–1978), American pioneering parachutist
Anna Thompson (disambiguation)